Sir Robert Henry Thoroton Hildyard, styled Mr Justice Hildyard (born 10 October 1952), is a British High Court Judge.

Personal life and education 
He was educated at Eton College and Christ Church, Oxford. Hildyard married Isabella Jane Rennie in 1980, with whom he had three daughters with, they divorced in 2010. He later remarried a woman named Lucy Gibson and had another daughter. He is a member of the Garrick Club.

Career 
He was called to the Bar at Inner Temple in 1977 and joined Lincoln's Inn in 1994. He was appointed a Queen's Counsel in 1994, deputy judge of the High Court from 2002 to 2011, bencher of Lincoln's Inn in 2005 and was attorney-general to the Duchy of Lancaster from 2008 to 2011. He has been a judge of the High Court of Justice (Chancery Division) since 2011. He received his customary Knighthood in 2012 from the then monarch Queen Elizabeth II in St James's Palace.

He was made a deputy lieutenant for Nottinghamshire in 2014.

References

1952 births
Living people
People educated at Eton College
Alumni of Christ Church, Oxford
21st-century English judges
Chancery Division judges
Attorneys-General of the Duchy of Lancaster
Knights Bachelor
20th-century King's Counsel
21st-century King's Counsel
Members of the Inner Temple
Members of Lincoln's Inn
Deputy Lieutenants of Nottinghamshire